is a Japanese biologist who proposed an explanation for reduced diffusion speed of lipid and protein molecules in the cell membrane, based on a model of hop diffusion in which lipids are confined to a reduced space, created by a membrane-skeleton-induced compartments. this compartments allow the lipids or proteins freely in a limited region and limiting also the diffusion to other parts of the membrane. Getting to a new compartment is called "hop diffusion" while diffusion in the compartment is allowed by Brownian movement, the compartments of the cell are responsible of the reduced diffusion speed of the lipid or proteins when compared to artificial vesicles.

Citations
 JCB article on "hop diffusion"
 Paradigm shift of the plasma membrane concept from the two-dimensional continuum fluid to the partitioned fluid: high-speed single-molecule tracking of membrane molecules. Annu. Rev. Biophys. struct. 2005. 34:351-78. doi: 10.1146/annurev.biophys.34.040204.144637.

References

External links
 Akihiro Kusumi's profile on Kyoto University's homepage (in English)

Living people
Japanese biologists
1952 births